Prishib is a rural locality (a selo) and the administrative center of Prishibinsky Selsoviet of Yenotayevsky District, Astrakhan Oblast, Russia. The population was 1,096 as of 2010. There are 13 streets.

Geography 
Prishib is located 70 km northwest of Yenotayevka (the district's administrative centre) by road. Nikolskoye is the nearest rural locality.

References 

Rural localities in Yenotayevsky District